The 2018 South Dakota gubernatorial election took place on November 6, 2018, to elect the next governor of South Dakota.  Incumbent Republican governor Dennis Daugaard was term-limited and could not seek re-election to a third consecutive term.

Republican candidate Kristi Noem won against Democratic candidate Billie Sutton in the closest gubernatorial election in South Dakota since 1986. Noem also became the first female governor of the state. Her victory extended the longest active hold on a governorship by one party; the GOP has won every gubernatorial election in South Dakota since 1978.

Republican primary

Candidates

Declared
 Kristi Noem,  U.S. Representative, former State Representative
 Marty Jackley, Attorney General of South Dakota

Failed to qualify for Primary Ballot

 Lora Hubbel, former State Representative, Republican candidate for Governor in 2014

Declined
 Matt Michels, Lieutenant Governor of South Dakota
 Mark Mickelson, Speaker of the South Dakota House of Representatives

Debates
Jackley and Noem participated in three debates.

First Debate
In the first debate both candidates tried to define the other.  Jackley stated: “It’s Washington experience versus South Dakota experience.” “Marty’s background has been being a government lawyer,” Noem said.

Second Debate
In the second debate, Noem discussed Jackley’s scandals.  “In EB5, the state oversight program, nobody went to jail. On Gear-Up, still, nobody’s been punished. When we talk about what’s been going on in Brookings with the Global Aquaponics scam—a con artist, Tobias Ritesman, held a fundraiser for Marty Jackley. Marty attended his phony groundbreaking for his phony project,” Noem says. “People lost hundreds of thousands of dollars. Still, nobody’s been investigated and nobody’s been prosecuted. That needs to change in our state.”

Jackley was on the defensive during the second debate.  “Congresswoman, he didn’t hold a fundraiser for me. I was at an event that he was at, and I did go to a ground breaking because that’s what important in South Dakota,” Jackley says. “When we have businesses expanding I think it’s important that we attend those. You talk about Gear-Up, there hasn’t been a sentencing because these defendants are presumed innocent. But I as attorney general, unlike Washington, have done something about it. I actually formed a grand jury. Indictments have been issued. They’re schedule to begin jury trials in July—or, excuse me—June, June 26th and I plan on trying those personally, because that’s what a leader does.”

Final Debate
In the final debate, Jackley and Noem took tough questions about workforce development, anti-discrimination laws, drugs, uniting Democrats and Republicans in the state to make critical decisions and much more.
While they spent a lot of time talking about their plans for the state, they also spent a lot of time attacking each others' records.
A major topic of contention you might not expect? Boards and commissions. The state currently has 134 of them. Noem says she wants to streamline different processes for licensure, eliminating "red tape" but Jackley disagrees.
"Every time that a proposal comes forward to create a new 'blue ribbon' task force, a board or a commission, what typically comes with that is another layer of bureaucracy," Noem said.
Jackley defended the government bureaucracy.  "We need a governor that understands that various different boards, isn't out there criticizing different boards and saying that type of service isn't important," Jackley said.
Jackley spoke about putting together a task force to work on government transparency and open records laws.
"I'm committed when I become governor to put forth a taskforce ...because we need to take a look at the open records law," he said.
And they both ended the debate with another jab at one another.
"It really comes to down to Washington experience versus South Dakota experience," Jackley said. "The congresswoman has been spending considerable time and effort talking about Marty Jackley, but I'm talking about you, South Dakota."  "Days ago he stood up and talked about protecting victims while behind the scenes he was actively working to silence one to further his political career," Noem said. "You deserve a governor who will be honest with you, who will tell you the truth and who is willing to be accountable."

Polling

Results

Democratic primary

Candidates

Declared
 Billie Sutton, Minority Leader of the South Dakota Senate

Declined
 Stephanie Herseth Sandlin, former U.S. Representative
 Mike Huether, Mayor of Sioux Falls

Libertarian Party

Candidates

Declared
 Kurt Evans, former science teacher, Libertarian nominee for U.S. Senator in 2002
 C.J. Abernathey

Results

Constitution Party

Following an internal controversy within the Constitution Party of South Dakota over who was the legal party chair, Dan Lederman—individually and in his capacity as chair of the South Dakota Republican Party—sued Republican secretary of state Shantel Krebs to prevent her from certifying any Constitution Party nominees for the general-election ballot. For somewhat complex reasons, state circuit judge Patricia DeVaney ruled in favor of the Republican Party on August 17.

G. Matt Johnson and Lora Hubbel—Constitution Party nominees for the state's at-large U.S. House seat and governor respectively—then sued Krebs in federal court on August 29 seeking ballot access for themselves and four other Constitution Party nominees. For various procedural reasons, federal district judge Roberto Lange ruled against the Constitution Party on October 1.

Candidates

Declared
 Lora Hubbel, former State Representative, Republican candidate for Governor in 2014
 Terry LaFleur

Withdrawn
 Rick Gortmaker

Independents

Candidates

Declined
 Mike Huether, Mayor of Sioux Falls
 Lora Hubbel, former State Representative, Republican candidate for Governor in 2014

General election

Candidates
Kristi Noem (Republican), U.S. Representative
Running mate: Larry Rhoden, State Representative
Billie Sutton (Democratic), Minority Leader of the South Dakota Senate
Running mate: Michelle Lavallee, Businesswoman
Kurt Evans (Libertarian), 2002 nominee for U.S. Senator
Running mate: Richard Shelatz, Vice-Chairman of the Libertarian Party of South Dakota

Predictions

Endorsements

Polling

Results

Results by County

Counties that flipped from Republican to Democratic 

 Bon Homme (largest city: Springfield)
 Brookings (largest city: Brookings)
 Brown (largest city: Aberdeen)
 Charles Mix (largest city: Lake Andes)
 Corson (largest city: McLaughlin)
 Day (largest city: Webster)
 Dewey (largest city: North Eagle Butte)
 Hughes (largest city: Pierre)
 Lake (largest city: Madison)
 Mellette (largest city: White River)
 Miner (largest city: Howard)
 Minnehaha (largest city: Sioux Falls)
 Moody (largest city: Flandreau)
 Roberts (largest city: Sisseton)
 Spink (largest city: Redfield)
 Yankton (largest city: Yankton)
 Ziebach (largest city: Dupree)

References

External links
Candidates at Vote Smart 
Candidates at Ballotpedia

Official campaign websites
Kristi Noem (R) for Governor
Billie Sutton (D) for Governor
Kurt Evans (L) for Governor

gubernatorial
South Dakota
2018